Neillsville Municipal Airport  is a city owned public use airport located three nautical miles (6 km) east of the central business district of Neillsville, a city in Clark County, Wisconsin, United States. It is also known as Kurt Listeman Field. It is included in the Federal Aviation Administration (FAA) National Plan of Integrated Airport Systems for 2021–2025, in which it is categorized as a local general aviation facility.

Although many U.S. airports use the same three-letter location identifier for the FAA and IATA, this facility is assigned VIQ by the FAA but has no designation from the IATA (which assigned VIQ to Viqueque Airport in Viqueque, East Timor).

Facilities and aircraft 
Neillsville Municipal Airport covers an area of 169 acres (68 ha) at an elevation of 1,238 feet (377 m) above mean sea level. It has one runway designated 10/28 with an asphalt surface measuring 3,400 by 60 feet (1,036 x 18 m) with approved GPS and NDB approaches.

For the 12-month period ending September 7, 2021, the airport had 7,520 aircraft operations, an average of 21 per day: 93% general aviation, 7% air taxi and less than 1% military. In February 2023, there were 17 aircraft based at this airport: all 17 single-engine.

See also 
 List of airports in Wisconsin

References

External links 
 Airport page at City of Neillsville website
  at Wisconsin DOT Airport Directory
 

Airports in Wisconsin
Buildings and structures in Clark County, Wisconsin